Sandwell Borough Council elections are held three years out of every four, with a third of the council elected each time. Sandwell Metropolitan Borough Council is the local authority for the metropolitan borough of Sandwell in the West Midlands, England. Since the last boundary changes in 2004, 72 councillors have been elected from 24 wards.

Political control
The first elections to the council were held in 1973, initially operating as a shadow authority until coming into its powers on 1 April 1974. Political control of the council since 1974 has been held by the following parties:

Leadership
The leaders of the council since 1997 have been:

Council elections
1998 Sandwell Metropolitan Borough Council election
1999 Sandwell Metropolitan Borough Council election
2000 Sandwell Metropolitan Borough Council election
2002 Sandwell Metropolitan Borough Council election
2003 Sandwell Metropolitan Borough Council election
2004 Sandwell Metropolitan Borough Council election (whole council elected after boundary changes)
2006 Sandwell Metropolitan Borough Council election
2007 Sandwell Metropolitan Borough Council election
2008 Sandwell Metropolitan Borough Council election
2010 Sandwell Metropolitan Borough Council election
2011 Sandwell Metropolitan Borough Council election
2012 Sandwell Metropolitan Borough Council election
2014 Sandwell Metropolitan Borough Council election
2015 Sandwell Metropolitan Borough Council election
2016 Sandwell Metropolitan Borough Council election
2018 Sandwell Metropolitan Borough Council election
2019 Sandwell Metropolitan Borough Council election
2021 Sandwell Metropolitan Borough Council election
2022 Sandwell Metropolitan Borough Council election

Borough result maps

By-election results

1997-2001

2001-2005

2005-2009

2009-2013

2014-present

References

By-election results

External links
Sandwell Metropolitan Borough Council

 
Politics of Sandwell
Council elections in the West Midlands (county)
Metropolitan borough council elections in England